Bruce Dobler (1939–2010) was an American writer.

Life
Born June 30, 1939 in Chicago, Illinois, Bruce Dobler earned his BA at the University of Illinois and MFA at the Iowa Writers' Workshop. In 1969–1970, Dobler was the first "writer-in-residence" at Phillips Exeter Academy. Later he taught English Literature and Writing at Windham College, the University of Arizona, and the University of Texas, El Paso. He taught writing at the University of Pittsburgh from 1979 until his retirement in 2008. Dobler was married to the poet Patricia Dobler (1939–2004). He divorced her in 1992. On July 4, 2008, he married Julieta (Julie) Barrera.

Death
Dobler was found dead in his home in El Paso, Texas on August 15, 2010. He was 71 years old at the time of his death, and was survived by his two daughters and second wife.

Works
 The Last Rush North, novel (Little,Brown, 1976)
 Ice Pick: A Novel about Life and Death in a Maximum Security Prison, novel (Little,Brown, 1974)
 I Made It Myself, (Grosset, 1973)

References

1939 births
2010 deaths
University of Illinois Urbana-Champaign alumni
Iowa Writers' Workshop alumni
University of Arizona faculty
University of Texas at El Paso faculty
University of Pittsburgh faculty
20th-century American novelists
Writers from Pittsburgh
Writers from Chicago
American male novelists
20th-century American male writers
Novelists from Pennsylvania
Novelists from Texas
Novelists from Illinois
Novelists from Arizona